Nevşehir Kapadokya Airport  is an airport serving, and located  in the northwest of, Nevşehir, Turkey.

History
The airport was opened on 15 November 1988 as Nevşehir Tuzköy Airfield. On 17 December 1998, the airfield renamed as Nevşehir Kapadokya Airport. In 2006, the airport served 392 cargo, 833 passenger aircraft and 27,832 passengers. The airport's domestic and international passenger terminal covers an area of 3,500 m2 and has a parking lot for 400 cars.

Airlines and destinations

Traffic Statistics

References

 

1998 establishments in Turkey
Airports established in 1998
Airports in Turkey
Buildings and structures in Nevşehir Province
Transport in Nevşehir Province